Regal Tip is one of the world's largest manufacturers of drum sticks and other percussion mallets.  They produce a range of beaters, but are particularly noted as a manufacturer of premium steel brushes and nylon tipped drumsticks. In 2003, the company was the largest manufacturer of brushes.

In 1958, drummer Joe Calato introduced his invention of the nylon tip drumstick to improve the longevity of sticks. Joe opened a factory to produce and ship sticks worldwide. The company also manufactures wood tip drumsticks, brushes, mallets, signature brushes, signature drumsticks, rutes, and general accessories.

Notable endorsers 
 Joe Calato, founder of the company 
Alex Van Halen of Van Halen  
Álvaro López
Don Henley of The Eagles 
Jules Radino of Blue Öyster Cult 
Brian Tichy of The Dead Daisies 
Chester Thompson of Genesis 
Jason Sutter of Smash Mouth 
Danny Needham of Venom 
Kerim Lechner of Septicflesh 
Paul Mazurkiewicz of Cannibal Corpse
Robert Sweet of Stryper 
Bill Gibson of Huey Lewis 
Jeff Porcaro of Toto 
Jeff Hamilton, of Jeff Hamilton Trio 
Daniel Adair of Nickelback 
Keith Reber of Vanilla Ice 
Daniel De Los Reyes of Zac Brown 
Bill Kreutzmann of The Grateful Dead 
Mickey Hart of The Grateful Dead 
Bill Rieflin of REM 
Coady Willis of The Melvins 
Kris Gustofson of Trauma
Dale Crover of The Melvins 
Daray Brzozowski of Dimmu Borgir 
Dennis Zimmer of Lita Ford 
Frankie Lombardi of Dickey Betts 
Gary Mallaber, session great 
George Recile of Bob Dylan 
Kenny Washington, session great 
Dave Dzialak of Jeff Scott Soto 
Graeme Edge of The Moody Blues 
Kenny Dale Johnson of Chris Isaac 
Bill Janson of Independent Artist
Mickey Curry of Bryan Adams 
Rob Mount of Lou Gramm 
Ron Tutt of Elvis Presley and Neil Diamond 
Ryan Moran of Slightly Stoopid 
Ryan Van Poederooyen of Devin Townsend 
Stefanie Eulinberg of Kid Rock 
Tommy Craig of Pat Travers 
Joe LaBarbera of Bill Evans

Past endorsers include 
Stewart Copeland of The Police 
Max Weinberg of Bruce Springsteen 
Lars Ulrich of Metallica 
Aaron Sterling- Session Player 
Pete Holmes of Black N Blue 
Andy Newmark of David Bowie and Roxy Music
John Robinson, session player
Eric Carr of KISS
Russell Gilbrook of Uriah Heep
Glen Sobel of Alice Cooper
Tommy Clufetos of Ozzy Osbourne

References

Percussion instrument manufacturing companies
Musical instrument manufacturing companies of the United States